Sindre may refer to:

Rasmus Sindre (1859–1908), Norwegian farmer, newspaper editor and politician
Sindre Erstad (born 1982), Norwegian football defender
Sindre Fossum Beyer (born 1977), Norwegian politician for the Labour Party
Sindre Guldvog (born 1955), Norwegian publisher
Sindre Iversen (born 1989), Norwegian snowboarder
Sindre Marøy (born 1982), Norwegian retired football player, playing as an attacker

See also
Sandre
Sindar
Sindara
Sindari
Sinder
Sindri (disambiguation)